Dorcadion pseudomolitor is a species of beetle in the family Cerambycidae. It was described by Escalera in 1902, originally as a varietas of the species Dorcadion mosqueruelense. It is known from Spain. It contains the varietas Dorcadion pseudomolitor var. nigritulum.

See also 
Dorcadion

References

pseudomolitor
Beetles described in 1902